Skalice is a municipality and village in Hradec Králové District in the Hradec Králové Region of the Czech Republic. It has about 700 inhabitants.

Administrative parts
Villages of Číbuz and Skalička are administrative parts of Skalice.

References

Villages in Hradec Králové District